Miguel Ángel Ibarra Andrade (born March 15, 1990) is an American professional soccer player who plays for Charlotte Independence in the USL League One.

College and amateur
Ibarra played college soccer at Taft College from 2008 to 2009, and then at UC Irvine from 2010 to 2011. During his time at Taft, Ibarra was named as Central Valley Conference MVP and at Irvine was named as Named Big West Co-Offensive Player of the Year and All-Big West First Team in 2011.

During his time at college, Ibarra played with USL Premier Development League club Lancaster Rattlers between 2008 and 2010, and later with Orange County Blue Star in 2011.

Professional career
Ibarra was selected in the second round of the 2012 MLS Supplemental Draft (27th overall) by Portland Timbers, but was not signed by the club.

Minnesota United FC
Ibarra signed with NASL club Minnesota United FC on March 13, 2012. He made his professional debut on April 8, 2012 in a 0–0 draw against Carolina RailHawks. He was named to the NASL Best XI in 2013 and 2014. He was named NASL Player of the Month for September 2014 and was awarded the 2014 Golden Ball as the league's best player at the conclusion of the season.

Club León
Ibarra signed with Club León on June 10, 2015, for a fee reported to be near $1 million.

Return to Minnesota
Ibarra returned to Minnesota in January 2017 for their inaugural season in MLS. The Portland Timbers previously owned his MLS rights but sent them to Minnesota United as part of a trade for goalkeeper Jeff Attinella. His option was declined at the end of the 2019 season, releasing him from the club.

Seattle Sounders FC
On February 20, 2020, Ibarra signed with Seattle Sounders FC.

San Diego Loyal
On May 28, 2021, Ibarra joined USL Championship club San Diego Loyal SC for the 2021 season. Ibarra scored his first goal for San Diego on June 29, 2022, the winner in a 1-0 victory over Oakland Roots SC.

Charlotte Independence
On March 30, 2022, Ibarra signed with USL League One club Charlotte Independence. Ibarra scored his first goal for Charlotte on April 16, 2022 in a 2-1 win over Northern Colorado Hailstorm FC.

International career
Ibarra was called up to United States national team for an October 2014 friendly against Ecuador, becoming the first American second division player called up to the national team since 2005. He earned his first cap against Honduras on October 14, 2014.

Ibarra received a second call up to the national team for the final two games of the 2014 campaign but did not see playing time in either game. His first start came on February 8, 2015 in a USMNT friendly against Panama.

Personal life
Ibarra was born in the United States to Mexican parents.

Ibarra was teammates with former Minnesota Stars player Amani Walker while at UC Irvine. While at Minnesota they were roommates and carpooled to practice together.

During the 2014 season, Ibarra was joined in Minnesota by former Orange County Blue Star teammate Christian Ramirez. The two became roommates and formed a fruitful partnership on the field. Ibarra was nicknamed "Batman" and Ramirez "Superman" by the fans.

Career statistics

Honors
Individual
NASL Golden Ball: 2014
NASL Best XI: 2014
NASL Player of the Month – September 2014
NASL Best XI: 2013

References

External links
 UC Irvine profile
 Club profile
 

1990 births
Living people
American soccer players
American people of Mexican descent
American expatriate soccer players
UC Irvine Anteaters men's soccer players
Lancaster Rattlers players
Orange County Blue Star players
People from Lancaster, California
Minnesota United FC (2010–2016) players
Club León footballers
Minnesota United FC players
Seattle Sounders FC players
San Diego Loyal SC players
Charlotte Independence players
Association football midfielders
Soccer players from California
Sportspeople from Los Angeles County, California
Portland Timbers draft picks
Expatriate footballers in Mexico
USL League Two players
North American Soccer League players
Liga MX players
Major League Soccer players
United States men's international soccer players
All-American men's college soccer players
USL Championship players
USL League One players